Nina Sabnani (born 1956) is an Indian animation filmmaker, illustrator and an educator. She is known for her films which blend together animation and ethnography. Collaboration with diverse ethnic communities as well as storytelling with words and imagery have been her research interests.

Sabnani has taught for more than two decades at the National Institute of Design (NID), Ahmedabad. She is currently a professor at the Industrial Design Centre (IDC), IIT Bombay.

Academic background 
Sabnani graduated in painting from the Faculty of Fine Arts, MSU, Vadodara and completed a certificate program in animation film making at the NID, Ahmedabad. She received a Fulbright Fellowship in 1997 to purse post-graduate studies in film at Syracuse University, New York. Her doctoral research at the IDC, IIT Bombay was based on Rajasthan's Kaavad storytelling tradition.

Filmography

Bibliography 

 Sabnani, Nina. Stitching Stories: The Art of Embroidery in Gujarat. India, Tulika Publishers, 2011.
 Sabnani, Nina. Kaavad Tradition of Rajasthan: A Portable Pilgrimage. India, Niyogi Books, 2014.

Awards 

 2017 - Rajat Kamal Award for Best Animation in the film Hum Chitra Banate Hai, in Non-Feature Film Section.
 2018 - Lifetime Achievement Award for Illustration by Tata Trusts at Tata Lit Live, Mumbai

References 
Indian women film directors
Indian women animators

External links 

YouTube Channel
Interview on The Story of Indian Animation
Podcast on Landscape of Indian Animation
20th-century Indian women artists
Artists from Mumbai
1956 births
Living people
Maharaja Sayajirao University of Baroda alumni
Indian women illustrators
21st-century Indian women artists
Academic staff of National Institute of Design
Designers at National Institute of Design
Indian women designers